Rosaleen "Rosie" McCorley (born 14 January 1957) is an Irish Sinn Féin politician who was selected by her party as a member (MLA) of the Northern Ireland Assembly to represent the Belfast West constituency in June 2012.

She replaced her party colleague Paul Maskey, an abstentionist MP in the parliament of the United Kingdom, who had resigned from the Northern Ireland Assembly as part of Sinn Féin's policy of abolishing double jobbing. She lost her seat at the 2016 Assembly election.

A former housing officer, in 1991, McCorley was jailed for 66 years for the attempted murder of an army officer and possession of explosives. While in prison she obtained a first-class honours degree in social sciences with the Open University. She holds a diploma in Irish from the University of Ulster and a post-graduate diploma in Gaeilge agus Léann an Aistriúcháin from Queen's University Belfast.

She served eight years of her sentence before being released under the terms of the Good Friday Agreement in 1998. She was the first female prisoner to be released following the agreement. After her release, she worked for Coiste na nIarchimí, an Irish republican ex-prisoners’ group, for eight years, before taking up a post as political adviser with Sinn Féin in 2007 working with MLAs Fra McCann and Pat Sheehan.

References

1957 births
Living people
Politicians from Belfast
Sinn Féin MLAs
Northern Ireland MLAs 2011–2016
Irish people convicted of attempted murder
Republicans imprisoned during the Northern Ireland conflict
Female members of the Northern Ireland Assembly